Tong Bei literally translated as "Bronze Cowry" or "Bronze Shell", is an ancient coin found in China.

This coin itself is a replica of more ancient Cowry Money, made for the purpose of replacing it.

A cowry shell or bronze cowry was denominated in bèi (貝) and string of cowry shells was called a péng (朋) however it is not known how many bèi were in a péng.

References

External links 

Money in Ancient China.

Shang dynasty
Coins of China